Gulf Airport  is an airstrip near the farming community of Basilio,  south of Santa Cruz de la Sierra in the Santa Cruz Department of Bolivia.

See also

Transport in Bolivia
List of airports in Bolivia

References

External links 
OpenStreetMap - Basilio
Fallingrain - Gulf Airport
HERE/Nokia Maps - Basilio

Airports in Santa Cruz Department (Bolivia)